Ronald Wardall (February 12, 1937 Yakima, Washington - January 21, 2006) was an American poet.

Life
He was educated at the University of Washington and the New School for Social Research.
Wardall lived in Brooklyn Heights, New York.

His work appeared in Poetry, Field, Swink, Mudfish, and Skidrow Penthouse.

A Chapbook award has been named for him.
His full-length collection, "Lightning's Dance Floor", was published by Rain Mountain Press in 2010.

Awards
  2001 New York Foundation for the Arts Fellowship 
 2001 Dana Award

Works
 The Presence of a Weight, was published as part of the New School Series.
 
 Lightning's Dance Floor Rain Mountain Press, 2010

References

American male poets
1937 births
2006 deaths
People from Yakima, Washington
University of Washington alumni
The New School alumni
20th-century American poets
20th-century American male writers
People from Brooklyn Heights